Aleuroglyphus is a genus of mites in the family Acaridae.

Species
 Aleuroglyphus beklemishevi Zachvatkin, 1953
 Aleuroglyphus ovatus (Troupeau, 1879)
 Aleuroglyphus siculus (Fumouze & Robin, 1867)
 Aleuroglyphus zaheri Hafez & Salem, 1988

References

Acaridae